Lepki is a Papuan language spoken in Western New Guinea, near its relatives Murkim and Kembra.  Only a few hundred words have been recorded, in hastily collected word lists.

Øystein Lund Andersen (2007) has unpublished ethnography on the Lepki that includes a word list.

Phonology
Lepki is a tonal language.

Further reading
Andersen, Øystein Lund. 2007. The Lepki People of Sogber River, New Guinea. MA thesis, University of Cenderawasih, Jayapura.

References

Languages of western New Guinea
Lepki–Murkim languages